The 2010 MuchMusic Video Awards were held in Toronto, Ontario, Canada at MuchMusic's headquarters on 20 June 2010. Along with the MuchMusic VJ's, it was confirmed on the MuchMusic website that Miley Cyrus will co-host the show. The artists with the most nominations are Drake and Hedley with six. For the 1st time since 2001, Fuse televised the MMVAs in the United States. Hedley and Justin Bieber tied for most wins at the 2010 MMVAs with 3 wins each.

Winners and nominees
Nominees for the People's Choice awards were announced in early May 2010. One "wildcard" nominee was to be chosen in each of these categories (as voted by the Much Music viewers). The complete list of nominees, plus the wildcard pics, were released 18 May 2010.

Video of the Year
 Hedley — "Perfect"
 Billy Talent — "Devil on My Shoulder"
 Danny Fernandes — "Addicted"
 Nickelback — "I'd Come For You"
 Stereos — "Summer Girl"

Post Production of the Year
 Hedley — "Perfect"
 Classified f. Maestro, Choclair & Moka Only — "Quit While You're Ahead"
 illScarlett f. Kardinal Offishall – "Milkshakes and Razorblades"
 Lights — "Saviour"
 Three Days Grace — "Break"

Cinematography of the Year
  Trey Songz & Drake – "Successful" 
 Alexisonfire – "The Northern"
 Belly f. Snoop Dogg – "Hot Girl"
 Danny Fernandes – "Never Again"
 Hedley – "Perfect"

Director of the Year
 Billy Talent – "Saint Veronika" Director: Michael Maxxis
 Classified – "Oh Canada" Director: Cazhmere
 Hedley – "Perfect" Director: Kyle Davison
 k-os f. Saukrates – "I Wish I Knew Natalie Portman" Director: X
 Shawn Desman – "Shiver" Director: RT!

Pop Video of the Year
 Hedley – "Cha-Ching"
 Down With Webster – "Your Man"
 Faber Drive – "G-Get Up and Dance"
 Marianas Trench – "Celebrity Status"
 Stereos – "Summer Girl"

MuchLOUD Rock Video of the Year
 Billy Talent – "Devil On My Shoulder"
 Alexisonfire – "Young Cardinals"
 Die Mannequin – "Bad Medicine"
 Nickelback – "I'd Come For You"
 Three Days Grace – "Break"

MuchVIBE Hip Hop Video of the Year
 Trey Songz & Drake – "Successful"
 Belly f. Snoop Dogg – "Hot Girl"
 Classified – "Oh Canada"
 k-os f. Saukrates – "I Wish I Knew Natalie Portman"
 Kardinal Offishall f. Riley – "We Gon Go"

VideoFACT Indie Video of the Year
 Belly f. Snoop Dogg – "Hot Girl"
 Alexisonfire – "Young Cardinals"
 Arkells – "Pullin' Punches"
 Metric – "Gold Guns Girls"
 Ten Second Epic f. Lights – "Every Day"

International Video of the Year – Artist
 Miley Cyrus – "Party in the U.S.A."
 Adam Lambert – "Whataya Want from Me"
 Eminem – "Beautiful"
 Jason Derulo – "Whatcha Say"
 Jay-Z feat. Alicia Keys – "Empire State of Mind"
 Katy Perry – "Waking Up in Vegas"
 Ke$ha – "Tik Tok"
 Lady Gaga feat. Beyoncé – "Telephone"
 Rihanna – "Rude Boy"
 Taylor Swift – "You Belong with Me"

International Video of the Year – Group
  Jonas Brothers – "Paranoid"
 3OH!3 f. Katy Perry – "Starstrukk"
 Cobra Starship f. Leighton Meester – "Good Girls Go Bad"
 Gorillaz – "Stylo"
 Green Day – "21 Guns"
 Kings Of Leon – "Notion"
 MGMT – "Flash Delirium"
 The Black Eyed Peas – "I Gotta Feeling"
 Tokio Hotel – "Automatic"
 Young Money – "BedRock"

International Video of the Year by a Canadian
 Justin Bieber – "One Time"
 Avril Lavigne – "Alice"
 Drake – "Over"
 Drake f. Kanye West, Lil Wayne & Eminem – "Forever"
 Justin Bieber ft. Ludacris – "Baby"

MuchMusic.com Most Watched Video
Young Artists for Haiti – Wavin' Flag

UR Fave: Video
 Justin Bieber f. Ludacris — "Baby"
 Drake featuring Kanye West, Lil Wayne and Eminem — "Forever"
 Hedley — "Perfect"
 Marianas Trench — "Celebrity Status"
 WILDCARD: Avril Lavigne – "Alice"

UR Fave: International Video
 Adam Lambert — "Whataya Want From Me"
 Ke$ha — "TiK ToK"
 Lady Gaga f. Beyonce — "Telephone"
 Miley Cyrus — "Party in the U.S.A."
 WILDCARD: Taylor Swift — "You Belong With Me"

UR Fave: New Artist
 Justin Bieber f. Ludacris — "Baby"
 Down With Webster — "Rich Girl$"
 Drake f. Kanye West, Lil Wayne and Eminem — "Forever"
 Stereos — "Summer Girl"
 WILDCARD: Carly Rae Jepsen — "Bucket"

Performances

The following performances are in chronological order.

 Miley Cyrus – "Party in the U.S.A." (Parking Lot Stage)
 Down with Webster – "Your Man" (Parking Lot Stage)
 Adam Lambert – "Whataya Want from Me" (John St. Stage)
 Marianas Trench – "Celebrity Status" (Rooftop Stage)
 Kesha – "Tik Tok" (Parking Lot Stage)
 Hedley – "Perfect" (John St. Stage)
 Katy Perry – "California Gurls" (Parking Lot Stage)
 Drake – "Over" (John St. Stage)
 Justin Bieber – "Somebody to Love" and "Baby" medley (Parking Lot Stage)
 Miley Cyrus – "Can't Be Tamed" (Parking Lot Stage)

Appearances
 Leah Miller and Blake McGrath
 Charlotte Arnold
 Kellan Lutz, Ashley Greene, Xavier Samuel
 Miranda Cosgrove
 Whitney Port
 Shailene Woodley, Daren Kagasoff and Megan Park
 Emily Osment
 Snooki and Pauly D
 Nina Dobrev
 Kristin Cavallari
 Perez Hilton
 Lights
 Faber Drive
 Nikki Yanofsky
 Girlicious
 Gabe Saporta of Cobra Starship
 Karl Wolf
 Three Days Grace
 Bedouin Soundclash
 JLS
 Shenae Grimes
 Jonathan Toews
 Jessica Szohr

References

External links
 Official website

MuchMusic Video Awards
Muchmusic Video Awards
Muchmusic Video Awards
Muchmusic Video Awards